Dove Dance School is a Christian-based dance studio in Warr Acres, Oklahoma that participated in the 2008 Beijing Olympic Festival. The school was founded in 1989, in Pensacola, Florida, but re-located twice, first to southwest Oklahoma City and then to its current location. Daphne Tardibono is the director of the school.

History
Dove Dance School opened its doors in 1992 in Northwest Oklahoma City for its first seven years. In 1999, Dove Dance purchased land and built facilities 3 miles north of the previous location. Dove Dance School was one of the first of its kind: combining Christian dance instruction in a DMA Certified Professional School. Dove Dance students have won over 45 regional and national titles along with numerous group awards. Dove Dance is known for its pieces which it performs at state and national ministry events each year.

Dove Dance has been featured in national publications such as DANCE Magazine, Dance Spirit, and Dance Teacher. The company was invited to dance in the 2008 Beijing Olympic Festival which opened many mission outreach opportunities in China.

Dance schools in the United States
Dance in Oklahoma